Machodoc is an unincorporated community in Westmoreland County, in the U.S. state of Virginia.

History
A post office called Machodoc was established in 1872, and remained in operation until it was discontinued in 1955. Machodoc is a name derived from a Native American language meaning "ceremonial river".

References

Unincorporated communities in Virginia
Unincorporated communities in Westmoreland County, Virginia